Ebru Tunalı (born 2 January 1993) is a Turkish badminton player. Together with Cemre Fere, she won the women's doubles titles at the Polish International, South Africa International, Jamaica International, and Giraldilla International. She also won the women's singles titles at the Jamaica and Giraldilla International.

Achievements

BWF International Challenge/Series 
Women's singles

Women's doubles

  BWF International Challenge tournament
  BWF International Series tournament
  BWF Future Series tournament

References

External links 

 

Living people
1993 births
Turkish female badminton players
Badminton players at the 2010 Summer Youth Olympics